Dhadhor or Dharhor is a subcaste of the Hindu Ahir (Yadav) caste in the Indian state of Uttar Pradesh. They are divided into various clans (section) and lineages.

Culture
Lorikayan is sung by Dhadhor Ahirs in Bhojpuri and Awadhi dialect, it is a folk song of veer rasa where events from the life of Lorik are described.

See also
Ahir
Krishnaut
Majhraut

References 

Ahir

Further reading 

Social groups of Uttar Pradesh